I Hope You're Sitting Down, also known as Jack's Tulips, is the 1994 debut album by Lambchop.

Track listing
 “Begin” – 3:30
 “Betweemus” – 5:26
 “Soaky in the Pooper” – 4:16
 “Because You Are the Very Air He Breathes” – 6:11
 “Under the Same Moon” – 4:55
 “I Will Drive Slowly” – 4:44
 “Oh, What a Disappointment” – 4:26
 “Hellmouth” – 2:52
 “Bon Soir, Bon Soir” – 3:32
 “Hickey” – 5:51
 “Breathe Deep” – 4:13
 “So I Hear You’re Moving” – 3:47
 “Let’s Go Bowling” – 5:29
 “What Was He Wearing?” – 3:18
 “Cowboy on the Moon” – 2:40
 “Or Thousands of Prizes” – 4:53 (City Slang edition only)
 “The Pack-Up Song” – 1:53

Personnel
Sourced from AllMusic.

Lampchop
 Kurt Wagner - vocals, guitar
 Paul Niehaus - guitar, trombone, vocals
 Marc William Trovillion - bass
 John Delworth - Farfisa and Hammond organs
 Jonathan Marx - clarinet, alto sax, vocals
 Deanna Varagona - alto sax, banjo, cello, vocals
 Allen Lowrey - drums, percussion
 Scott C. Chase - percussion

References

1994 debut albums
Lambchop (band) albums
Merge Records albums